Khunik or Khonik may refer to:
 Khunik, Alqurat
 Khunik (Khong-e Bala), Baqeran
 Khunik (32°46′ N 59°22′ E), Baqeran
 Khunik (32°48′ N 59°11′ E), Baqeran
 Khunik, Darmian
 Khunik-e Baz, Darmian
 Khunik, alternate name of Khunikak, Nehbandan
 Khunik-e Olya, Nehbandan
 Khunik-e Pain, Nehbandan
 Khunik-e Bala, Qaen
 Khunik-e Pain, Qaen
 Khunik-e Pay Godar, Qaen
 Khunik-e Tajen, Qaen
 Khunik, Sarbisheh
 Khunik Zirak
 Khunik, Razavi Khorasan

See also
 Khanik (disambiguation)